Armand Rougeau is a Canadian former professional wrestler. He is the son of Jacques Rougeau, Sr. and brother of former World Wrestling Federation (WWF) wrestlers Jacques Rougeau, Jr. and Raymond Rougeau. He performed in Canada before he was hired by the WWF. An injury forced him out of the ring for several years. He has wrestled occasional matches and worked as an auto mechanic since retiring from wrestling.

Career
Rougeau started wrestling in his native Canada in 1982. In 1983, while wrestling in the Montreal area, he formed a tag team with Dan Kroffat known as the Flying Canucks. They feuded with The Long Riders (Scott and Bill Irwin). They also had a rivalry with Richard Charland over Lutte Internationale's Canadian International Tag Team Championship. On February 8, 1987, Rougeau and Kroffat defeated Charland and Sheik Ali to win the title belts. They held the championship for over two months, dropping it to Charland and Chuck Simms on April 13. During his time with the company, Rougeau also competed as a singles wrestler, facing such opponents as Bob Orton, Jr.

He signed a contract to compete for the World Wrestling Federation (WWF) in 1986. One month before his WWF debut, he sustained a serious back injury. To repair the injury, he had two discs removed from his back, which forced him to retire. He operated an auto repair business after leaving wrestling. He did not wrestle for several years, until he agreed to wrestle in a tag team match for his brother Jacques's Lutte 2000 promotion in December 2001. He has come back for several matches since then but does not intend to return to wrestling on a regular basis.

Championships and accomplishments
Lutte Internationale
Canadian International Tag Team Championship (1 time) - with Dan Kroffat

See also
 Rougeau wrestling family

References

External links
Online World of Wrestling profile

1961 births
Canadian male professional wrestlers
Living people
People from Sainte-Anne-de-Bellevue, Quebec
Professional wrestlers from Quebec